A Guided Tour of Madness is a 3-CD/1-DVD anthology box set by English band Madness, released in 2011 on Union Square Music's collector's label Salvo. It features 70 singles and album tracks (from 1979’s One Step Beyond... to 2009’s The Liberty of Norton Folgate) and an exclusive DVD of the band's comeback concert at the Madstock festival in August 1992. It also includes a booklet with interviews with the band, photos, the cartoon Nutty Comic (1981) and the Madness Map of Camden, the band's historic stomping ground. With the exception of "Sweetest Girl," "Sorry," and "The Harder They Come," every one of the band's 34 singles to date is represented.

The compilation is notable as containing the only official physical release of the track "Le Grand Pantalon", which closes the collection. This slower, waltz version of "Baggy Trousers", complete with accordion and double bass, as well as French lyrics, was originally created as part of Madness' participation in Kronenbourg Brewery's 'Slow the Pace' ad campaign. However, its popularity led to the band recording a full version, initially available only as a free download.

Critical reception

AllMusic rated the box set 4 stars out of 5, saying, "A cut above most hastily assembled retrospectives, A Guided Tour of Madness is a cleverly selected affair which should satisfy anyone wishing to investigate more than their more ubiquitous commercial hits." The Super Deluxe Edition website wrote, "The care and attention in the included booklet, combined with the overall quality of the packaging, makes this an easy box set to recommend, even for the casual listener."

Track listing

Certifications and sales

Personnel
See individual albums for full personnel credits.
Madness
 Graham "Suggs" McPherson – vocals   
 Cathal Smyth – vocals, trumpet  
 Mike Barson - piano, keyboards 
 Chris Foreman – guitar 
 Mark Bedford – bass 
 Lee Thompson – saxophone, vocals 
 Daniel Woodgate – drums 
Additional musicians on bonus track "Le Grand Pantalon"
 Rachael Lander – strings
 Kirsty Mangan – strings
 Natalie Holt – strings
 Stephanie Benedetti – strings
 Louis Vause – accordion
 Lester Allen – banjo
Technical
 Clive Langer – producer (disc 1: 1-27 / disc 2: 1-22 / disc 3: 1-9, 15-21) 
 Alan Winstanley – producer (disc 1: 3-27 / disc 2: 1-22 / disc 3: 1-9, 15-20), DVD sound mix 
 Steve Dub – producer (disc 3: 10-14)
 John "Segs" Jennings – producer (disc 3: 10-14)
 Charlie Andrew – producer (disc 3: 21)
 Tim Turan – mastering
 Mark Brennan – compilation
 Daryl Smith – compilation
 Martin "Cally" Callomon – box theme, art direction, design
 Eric Watson – front cover photograph
 Clare Muller – black and white band photographs
 Paul Rider – band photographs
 Gavin Martin – booklet interviews
DVD
 Meedja – DVD authoring
 Juliet De Valero-Wills – executive producer 
 Malcolm Gerrie – executive producer 
 Dione Orram – producer 
 Rocky Oldham – producer 
 Gavin Taylor – director

References

External links
A Guided Tour of Madness

Madness (band) compilation albums
2011 compilation albums
Albums produced by Clive Langer
Albums produced by Alan Winstanley